Conus miliaris, common name the thousand-spot cone, is a species of sea snails, marine gastropod molluscs in the family Conidae, the cone snails and their allies.

Like all species within the genus Conus, these snails are predatory and venomous. They are capable of "stinging" humans, therefore live ones should be handled carefully or not at all.

Subspecies
 Conus miliaris miliaris Hwass in Bruguière, 1792
 Conus miliaris pascuensis Rehder, H.A., 1980

Description
The size of an adult shell varies between 12 mm and 43 mm. The spire is more or less raised, striate or sometimes nearly smooth, with or without tubercles The body whorl is striate, the stride usually grannlous towards the base, and sometimes throughout. The color of the shell is yellowish or light chestnut or grayish, variously clouded with darker chestnut or olive, often irregularly light-banded at the middle, and below the spire, and encircled with chestnut spots on the striae. The interior is chocolate, with a central white band. There is considerable variation in the height and coronation of the spire, as well as in the color and pattern of the markings.

Distribution
Conus miliaris is a species of wide distribution, and apparently everywhere common. It occurs in tropical to subtropical shallow water environments from the Red Sea and eastern shores of Africa in the western Indian Ocean (Aldabra, Chagos, Kenya, Madagascar, the Mascarene Basin, Mauritius, Mozambique and Tanzania) to Easter Island and Sala y Gómez in the southeastern Pacific (but not off the Galapagos Islands, the Marquesas Islands and Hawaii).; off Australia (New South Wales, Northern Territory, Queensland, Western Australia).

Feeding habits 
These snails are predatory and venomous. They are capable of "stinging" humans, therefore live ones should be handled carefully or not at all.

Presumably in response to the relative absence of congeners at Easter Island, Conus miliaris has undergone ecological release: it preys on a more diverse assemblage of prey at Easter Island and is more abundant at Easter Island than at other localities in its range. Conus miliaris from most areas in the Indo-West Pacific, where it co-occurs with as many as 36 congeners, preys almost exclusively on three species of eunicid polychaetes (Eunicidae).

But at Easter Island its diet is considerably broader and includes additional species of eunicids as well as several species of nereids, an onuphid and members of seven other polychaete families. Its prey on Easter Island include: Eunicidae includes Lysidice collaris, Nematonereis unicornis, Eunice afra, Eunice cariboea and Palola siciliensis; Nereididae includes Perinereis singaporensis; Onuphidae includes Onuphis sp.

Gallery
Below are several color forms and one subspecies:

References
This article incorporates CC-BY-2.5 text from the reference 

 Bruguière, M. 1792. Encyclopédie Méthodique ou par ordre de matières. Histoire naturelle des vers. Paris : Panckoucke Vol. 1 i-xviii, 757 pp. 
 Sowerby, G.B. (1st) 1834. Conus. pls 54-57 in Sowerby, G.B. (2nd) (ed). The Conchological Illustrations or coloured figures of all the hitherto unfigured recent shells. London : G.B. Sowerby (2nd).
 Kiener, L.C. 1845. Spécies général et Iconographie des coquilles vivantes, comprenant la collection du Muséum d'histoire Naturelle de Paris, la collection de Lamarck, celle du Prince Massena (appartenant maintenant a M. le Baron B. Delessert) et les découvertes récentes des voyageurs. Paris : Rousseau et Baillière Vol. 2. 
 Dautzenberg, Ph. (1929). Mollusques testacés marins de Madagascar. Faune des Colonies Francaises, Tome III
 Cernohorsky, W.O. 1978. Tropical Pacific Marine Shells. Sydney : Pacific Publications 352 pp., 68 pls. 
 Rehder, H. A. 1980. Smithson. Contrib. Zool. 289: 91, plate 9, figure 21–22.
 Röckel, D., Korn, W. & Kohn, A.J. 1995. Manual of the Living Conidae. Volume 1: Indo-Pacific Region. Wiesbaden : Hemmen 517 pp. 
 Filmer R.M. (2001). A Catalogue of Nomenclature and Taxonomy in the Living Conidae 1758 - 1998. Backhuys Publishers, Leiden. 388pp.
 Tucker J.K. (2009). Recent cone species database. September 4th 2009 Edition
 Spencer, H.; Marshall. B. (2009). All Mollusca except Opisthobranchia. In: Gordon, D. (Ed.) (2009). New Zealand Inventory of Biodiversity. Volume One: Kingdom Animalia. 584 pp
 Puillandre N., Duda T.F., Meyer C., Olivera B.M. & Bouchet P. (2015). One, four or 100 genera? A new classification of the cone snails. Journal of Molluscan Studies. 81: 1–23

External links
 The Conus Biodiversity website
 
 Cone Shells - Knights of the Sea

miliaris
Gastropods described in 1792